Syracosphaeraceae is a family of algae consisting of the following genera:

 Calciopappus 
 Caneosphaera 
 Coronosphaera 
 Deutschlandia 
 Lohmannosphaera 
 Michaelsarsia 
 Ophiaster 
 Syracosphaera

References

Haptophyte families